Callan Pinckney (born Barbara Biffinger Pfeiffer Pinckney September 26, 1939 – March 1, 2012) was an American fitness professional who created and popularized as well as excelled in the Callanetics exercises. 

Pinckney's nine books became international best-sellers and the video series that followed sold over 6 million copies. Pinckney's first video release, Callanetics: 10 Years Younger In 10 Hours, outsold every other fitness video in the US. Within three years it had become the all-time individual best-selling fitness video.

Early life
Pinckney was born on September 26, 1939, in Savannah, Georgia.  She was born with spinal curvatures, one hip higher than the other and severely turned-in feet. As a result, Pinckney was forced to wear leg braces for seven years. In an effort to correct her alignment, she spent the next decade studying classical ballet.

Eleven years around the world
After two years of college, Pinckney went to Bremerhaven, Germany. For nearly a year, she traveled across Europe, sleeping in a Volkswagen. She took odd jobs whenever she needed. When Pinckney reached London, she worked manual labor jobs such as shoveling coal and snow for eight hours for little more than $3 a day. 

After her time in London, Pinckney went to Cape Town, South Africa, where she obtained a job with an advertising agency.  After a year there, she traveled to Zimbabwe, Kenya, and Zaire. She worked part of the time tracking animal migrations in the wild. To supplement her income, she took on menial labor jobs. Due to Pinckney's inadequate diet, she suffered from severe amoebic dysentery and lost 78 pounds. Her heavy rucksack also put a great strain on her back, shoulders and knees. 

Pinckney soon decided to travel to Asia.  She went first to Mumbai, India and then to Sri Lanka. During this time in Sri Lanka, Pinckney realized that her muscles had lost all their tone and she had no flexibility or extension. The movements she had been able to do as a teenager were now almost impossible. After reaching Japan, Pinckney obtained a job recording British voice-over tapes for advertising. She also wrote about her experiences on the road for a Japanese magazine, modeled miniskirts, and managed a bar with Western waitresses.

Eleven years after leaving London, Pinckney returned.  Regarding her medical condition, one British doctor advised her to have surgery on her knees; another said her back would never recover. She was in constant pain and in an attempt to alleviate her suffering she turned first to ballet and then to yoga and toning classes. She trained in the Martha Graham dance technique at The Place (London). She also attended the Rehabilitation Exercise Studio set up by German dancer Lotte Berk. Berk had seriously injured her back while dancing and had devised a program to ease her discomfort whilst maintaining her strength and flexibility.

Returning home
In 1972 Pinckney returned to Savannah, Georgia.  Soon after her arrival, she left for New York City to assume a teaching job at an exercise studio. However, after disagreements with the owner regarding the exercise regimen, Pinckney quit the studio.

During this period, Pinckney worked to find new exercise methods. She found ways to protect her back and increase the effectiveness of different exercises. She learned how to strengthen and alleviate the pain from her knees. She also discovered that she could quickly tone her muscles using these new movements. She started teaching private students in her apartment. 

After consulting with a numerologist, Pinckney decided to change her first name to "Callan" to help provide her direction for her future.

Birth of Callanetics
As her exercise classes grew in popularity, Pinckney needed to give them a name. One of her students would always refer to them as "Callan-etics", a name-blend of "Callan" and "athletics". Pinckney decided to use that name.

In 1984, after seven years of teaching Callanetics, Pinckney published her first book, Callanetics: 10 Years Younger In 10 Hours. Within two years the book had sold close to a million copies in the United States alone. She was profiled in Time and People magazines and appeared on many chat shows.

In 1986, Pinckney released the first Callanetics video. Based on word-of-mouth, the video became a best-seller. In 1987, Pinckney trained one of her advanced students to become the first certified Callanetics instructor. 

Toward the end of 1987 Pinckney was invited to represent the United States in the World Elephant Polo Competition in Nepal.  She put together the Callanetics Ladies Team which included amongst others orca trainer Judy Peterson. The team finished in sixth place. Pinckney said that riding the elephant was therapeutic for her back.

In 1988, Pinckney published Callanetics For Your Back. Pinckney believed that many people were suffering back problems due to the radical fitness movement in the United States during that period. The book became another bestseller.  To tie in with the book release, Pinckney released a new video Super Callanetics.  This video showed more intense versions of the familiar Callanetics exercises.  The video also became a bestseller.

Return from London
In 1989, Pinckney released the Beginning Callanetics video. This was a shorter version of the original one-hour program with more basic explanations for people who had never experienced the Callanetics method. Pinckney created the shorter program and included some of the exercises she had written about in her "Callanetics For Your Back" book. Later that year, Callan published her third book, Callanetics Countdown for people who did not have enough time for a full hour of exercise. It became another bestseller.

In March 1989 Pinckney traveled to London to promote a paperback edition of the original Callanetics book in Harrods department store.

Callanetics franchise
In November 1990, Pinckney decided to set up a franchise for Callanetics studios and introduce a proper teacher training program. She opened the Callanetics Franchise Corporation with headquarters in Denver, Colorado. From here teachers were trained and licences were given for studios across the country. Pinckney set up a new Manhattan  studio in the attic of Carnegie Hall to be run by her student Ruth Jeffries.  Over the next 12 months, nine more studios opened in the United States.

In May 1991 the Callanetics Franchise Corporation received its first requests from people wanting to set up studios in England and Scotland. By September several more teachers from the UK were trained in Denver with the intention of setting up studios across England. Fourteen studios were opened in Belgium and Switzerland and the Callanetics Franchise Corporation were receiving requests from all over the world. To cope with the demand for qualified Callentics teachers, Pinckney started training master teachers who would be authorized to train teachers in their own countries.

Pinckney's next book, Super Callanetics, gave her the chance to give a more in depth explanation of the advanced exercises seen in the earlier video of the same name. In 1992, she published the Quick Callanetics video and book series. In them Pinckney demonstrated three short programs each aimed at toning a different area of the body in only 20 minutes.  In 1993 she published "AM/PM Callanetics", a program consisting of two daily routines to shape up the entire body. The book and accompanying video contained a 25-minute morning routine to energize participants for the day and a 25-minute evening routine to relax them for the night.

Retirement
In 1995, Pinckney published her final book Callanetics: Fit Forever. The book addressed many middle-aged concerns from dieting and nutrition to menopause and stress. She included an eating plan and aerobic exercise that would increase the heart rate but without sharp, jarring movements, leaping up and down to loud music or pressure on the back or joints. It had to be challenging but without any discomfort or stress. 

Pinckney continued to advise instructors on her program for several years before entering retirement in 1998.

Death

Pinckney died on March 1, 2012, in Savannah.

Official Callanetics books

Official Callanetics videos

Official Callanetics DVDs

References

External links
 Official Callanetics Website
 Official Callanetics Streaming Video Website

American exercise instructors
1939 births
2012 deaths
Writers from Savannah, Georgia
Sportspeople from Savannah, Georgia